Natalia Anatolievna Rudina (born Minyaeva, 31 March 1974 in Dzerzhinsk, USSR), better known by stage name Natali, is a Russian singer, composer, songwriter, and TV presenter. 

Initially regarded as a one-hit wonder for her 1997 song "" (Ветер с моря дул; Wind Was Blowing From Sea), Natali released a string of commercially successful singles in the early 2010s, of which her 2013 song "" (О Боже, какой мужчина!; Oh My God, What a Man!) is best known.

Early life
Natali was born in the provincial city of Dzerzhinsk in 1974 in a family of a factory worker and a laboratory worker. She was noted to be academically competent and was an active student. At the age of 13, she persuaded her parents to let her have piano lessons and later, she taught herself to play guitar. At the age of 16, she starred in a Lenfilm production called Moy gorod, in which she portrayed a student.

Career
As a teen, she was active in music festivals and performed with her siblings as part of the musical group Shokoladnyi bar. Later, under the supervision of Alexander Rudin, that group released two albums. Natali married Rudin at the age of 17 in 1991. Two years later, the couple moved to Moscow to develop Natali's career. She took on the pseudonym Natali while working with her first producer Valery Ivanov, stating later that it was derived from a nickname she had in school. 

Natali released her first album Rusalochka in 1994, but it did cause her big breakthrough. A subsequent album Snezhnaya rozha helped her further acquire fame in her home town, but did not result in nationwide success. Her big break came with the release of "Veter s morya dul", which she had partially penned herself, in 1997. The song became one of the biggest hits that year in Russia and surrounding countries. Her subsequent album Veter s morya was among the most-sold albums that year in Russia. She debuted at Pesnya goda in 1998 with the song "Kak zhal'".

With "Veter s morya dul", Natali performed at Pesnya goda in 1999. Her next large hit was "Cherepashka" in 2000, albeit it did not reach up to the popularity of "Veter s morya dul". After the turn of the century, her fame started to drastically decline. Despite not appearing in charts and on television frequently, she continued performing in night clubs throughout the 2000s. In a 2005 article, Komsomolskaya Pravda regarded her as a "forgotten star".

In 2008, Natali participated in the NTV television project Superstar-2008. After that, she released her ninth studio album Semnadtsat' mgnoveniy lyubvi. The album was a commercial failure.

After several years of living in the shadows, Natali recorded her first single in eight years in 2012. On 5 November 2012, she released "O Bozhe, kakoy muzhchina!". The song received public attention following an appearance of Natali in the Russian talkshow Let Them Talk in April 2013, when she discussed how her life had developed fifteen years since her biggest and only hit. The single became a sleeper hit, acquiring most of its airplay in the Summer of 2013. The single then became the most rotated track on Russkoe Radio, although it only reached #188 in the TopHit airplay charts. Its music video, released in February 2013, became one of the most-watched videos on Russian YouTube throughout 2013 and 2014. 

Following the commercial success of "O Bozhe, kakoy muzhchina!", Natali received her first Golden Gramophone Award from Russkoe Radio. During the 2013 RU.TV Awards, Natali received the tongue-in-cheek award Sometimes, They Return. She returned to Pesnya goda with the song after a fourteen year break. 

In October 2013, Natali recorded a duet with Nikolay Baskov, titled "Nikolay". The song peaked at #34 of the TopHit airplay charts and gave Natali another Golden Gramophone Award, in 2014. Together with Baskov, Natali appeared on a plethora of musical television programmes, including Saturday evening and Miss Russkoe Radio. 

Natali participated in the first season of the Russian adaption of Your Face Sounds Familiar. on Channel One Russia in 2014. Later that year, she released her first studio album in five years, titled Shakherezada.  

In early 2015, Natali teamed up with MC Doni to release the song "Ty takoy". The track peaked at #24 at the TopHit airplay charts, but its music video quickly received attention on YouTube, where it became the first Russian-language song to receive over 100 million views in July 2016. In late 2016, Natali started withdrawing more from public life. In April 2017, she gave birth to her third son.

With "U menya est' tol'ko ty", she appeared in the 2017 edition of Pesnya goda. The song subsequently peaked at #87 on the TopHit airplay charts. In 2020, Natali released her eleventh studio album Novye 80-e.

Private life 
Natali has been married to Alexander Rudin since 1991, has three sons – Arseni (born 2001), Anatoly (born 2010), Evgeni (born 2017). 

In an interview in the television show Let Them Talk in 2013, Natali said the inability of being able to conceive a child with her husband until the birth of their first son had let to her having suicidal thoughts.

Discography 
Studio albums
 1990 – "Супербой" (with "Поп-Галактика"; Superboy)
 1991 – "Звёздный Дождь" (with "Поп-Галактика"; Star Rain)
 1994 – "Русалочка" (Mermaid)
 1996 – "Снежная роза" (Snowy Rose)
 1998 – "Ветер с моря" (Wind From the Sea)
 1999 – "Считалочка" (Counting)
 2000 – "Первая любовь" (First Love)
 2001 – "Красавица – не красавица" (Remix album) (Beauty - is not beautiful)
 2002 – "Не влюбляйся" (Do Not Fall in Love)
 2004 – "Всё, что мне надо" (All That I Need)
 2009 – "Семнадцать мгновений любви" (Seventeen Moments of Love)
 2014 – "Шахерезада" (Scheherazade)
 2016 – "О, Боже, какой мужчина!" (Oh My God, What a Man!) – reissue of the album "Шахерезада"

Singles
 1995 – "Розовый рассвет"
 1996 – "Снежная роза"
 1996 – "Звезда по имени Солнце" (cover for a Viktor Tsoi song)
 1997 – "Ветер с моря дул"
 1998 – "Облака"
 1999 – "Не стерпелось, не слюбилось"
 1999 – "Считалочка"
 2000 – "Черепашка"
 2000 – "Первая любовь"
 2001 – "Часто-часто"
 2002 – "Конфетка"
 2002 – "Мир без тебя"
 2003 – "Море цвета джинсов"
 2003 – "Всё, что мне надо"
 2004 – "Вот как"
 2006 – "Ветер с моря дул (Remake)" (2006 version)
 2012 – "О Боже, какой мужчина!"
 2013 – "Николай" (duet with Nikolay Baskov)
 2014 – "Шахерезада"
 2014 – "Платье на бретелях"
 2014 – "Давай со мной за звёздами"
 2014 – "Ветер с моря дул" (2014 version)
 2014 – "Вишня (Расцвела под окошком)" (MP3 Play)
 2014 – "Новогодняя"
 2015 – "Ты такой" (duet with MC Doni)
 2015 – "Володя"
 2016 – ″Спроси Пригожина″
 2017 – ″У меня есть только ты″
 2018 – ″Я без оружия″ (with band Sultan Uragan)
 2019 – ″Мужчина-мечта″
 2020 – ″Поехали на дачу″
 2021 – ″Белая зима″
 2022 – ″Тест грусти″
 2022 – ″Хештег″

Compilations
 1998 – "Провинциальная девчонка" (Provincial girl)
 2002 – "The Best: Лучшие хиты" (The Best: Greatest Hits)
 2003 – "Гармония" (Harmony)
 2004 – "Я люблю тебя: новое и лучшее" (I love you: new and better)

Videos

Awards and nominations

References

External links 
  
 
 
 
 «По имени Наташка» — Передача «Пусть говорят», эфир от 03. 04 2013 и 14.07.2014 // Сайт Первого канала (www.1tv.ru)

1974 births
Russian pop singers
Russian women singer-songwriters
Russian composers
Russian actresses
Russian television presenters
Russian Orthodox Christians from Russia
Living people
People from Dzerzhinsk, Russia
21st-century Russian women singers
21st-century Russian singers
Russian women television presenters
Winners of the Golden Gramophone Award